The Merritt-Ragan House in Hawkinsville, Georgia is listed on the National Register of Historic Places.

It is a two-story frame house with elements of Classical Revival and Queen Anne architecture.  It was built in c.1840 with symmetrical design, square paneled portico columns and other elements of Classical Revival style.  It was renovated in 1895 into its two-story form, with a wrap-around porch.  It has a c.1930 garage that is a second contributing building in the listing.

It is located at 15 Merritt St., which before a renumbering of the street addresses was 316 Merritt St., the address given in its NRHP listing.

References

Houses on the National Register of Historic Places in Georgia (U.S. state)
Queen Anne architecture in Georgia (U.S. state)
Houses completed in 1930
National Register of Historic Places in Pulaski County, Georgia
Houses in Pulaski County, Georgia